Gannet Lake is a lake in the U.S. state of Georgia.

Gannet Lake was named for flocks of gannets on the water.

References

Landforms of Ware County, Georgia
Lakes of Georgia (U.S. state)